Play It Again is a British documentary television series.

Play It Again may also refer to:
Play It Again (EP), a 2013 release from Becky G
"Play It Again" (song), a 2014 song by Luke Bryan
Play It Again (record label), a British record label formed in 1989

See also
Play it again, Sam (disambiguation)